The following is a list of all IFT-licensed over-the-air television stations broadcasting in the Mexican state of Campeche. There are 15 television stations in Campeche.

List of television stations

|-

Notes

References

Television stations in Campeche
Camp